The discography for the American emo band Braid consists of four studio albums, five split 7-inch vinyl EPs, four 7-inch vinyl singles, and one home video release.

Studio albums

Live albums

Compilation albums

Singles/EPs

Split releases

Videography

Discographies of American artists